Macrouroides inflaticeps, the Inflated whiptail, is a species of rattail found in the oceans at depths of from  on the continental slopes.  This species grows to a length of  TL.

References
 

Marine fish

Gadiformes
Fish described in 1912